Athalia (minor planet designation: 515 Athalia), provisional designation , is a carbonaceous Themistian asteroid from the outer regions of the asteroid belt, approximately 40 kilometers in diameter. It was discovered on 20 September 1903, by German astronomer Max Wolf at the Heidelberg Observatory in southwest Germany. The asteroid was named after the ancient Judahite queen Athaliah.

Orbit and classification 

Athalia is a Themistian asteroid that belongs to the Themis family, a very large family of carbonaceous asteroids, named after 24 Themis. It orbits the Sun in the outer main belt at a distance of 2.6–3.7 AU once every 5 years and 6 months (2,016 days). Its orbit has an eccentricity of 0.17 and an inclination of 2°. The body's observation arc begins at Heidelberg with its official discovery observation in 1903.

Physical characteristics

Spectral type 

In the SMASS classification, the asteroid is a Cb-subtype, that transitions between the carbonaceous C-type to the B-type asteroids. In the Tholen classification, no type could be assigned to Athalia since its spectrum was inconsistent as it resembled that of an S-type asteroid, while its albedo was far too low for that spectral type.

Rotation period 

In October 2015, a rotational lightcurve of Athalia was obtained from photometric observations by American astronomer Frederick Pilcher at the Organ Mesa Observatory in New Mexico, United States. Lightcurve analysis gave a well-defined rotation period of 10.636 hours with a brightness amplitude of 0.22 magnitude.

Diameter and albedo 

According to the surveys carried out by the Japanese Akari satellite, the Spitzer Space Telescope and the Wide-field Infrared Survey Explorer with its subsequent NEOWISE mission, Athalia measures about 40 kilometers in diameter and its surface has an albedo of about 0.03 to 0.04.

The Collaborative Asteroid Lightcurve Link adopts the results obtained by the Infrared Astronomical Satellite IRAS, that is, an albedo of 0.039 and a diameter of 38.22 kilometers based on an absolute magnitude of 11.23.

Naming 

This minor planet was named after Athaliah (Athalia), the daughter of King Ahab and Queen Jezebel of Israel. The murderous queen of the ancient Kingdom of Judah was the only woman to ever rule the Hebrew kingdoms. The official naming citation was mentioned in The Names of the Minor Planets by Paul Herget in 1955.

References

External links 
 Asteroid Lightcurve Database (LCDB), query form (info )
 Dictionary of Minor Planet Names, Google books
 Asteroids and comets rotation curves, CdR – Observatoire de Genève, Raoul Behrend
 Discovery Circumstances: Numbered Minor Planets (1)-(5000) – Minor Planet Center
 
 

000515
Discoveries by Max Wolf
Named minor planets
000515
19030920